Bykovsky, Bykovskyi or Bykovski is a Slavic masculine surname originating from the word byk meaning a bull; its feminine counterpart is Bykovskaya (Belarusian, Russian) or Bykovska (Ukrainian). The Polish version is Bykowski/Bykowska. 

The surname may refer to:
 Ihor Bykovskyi (born 1996), Ukrainian footballer
 Sergey Bykovsky (born 1972), Belarusian boxer
 Valery Bykovsky (1934–2019), Soviet cosmonaut

References

Russian-language surnames
Ukrainian-language surnames